Howard Brodie Stephens (September 26, 1901 – April 18, 1983) was a college football player and physician. He is perhaps best known as the one on the receiving end of the pass from Brick Muller in the 1921 Rose Bowl. He was selected All-American in 1921.

References

1983 deaths
California Golden Bears football players
American football ends
Physicians from California
1901 births
All-American college football players